Yummy, Yummy, Yummy is a 1969 album by Julie London. It was London's final album for Liberty Records, her label since 1955. It was produced by Tommy Oliver, who was also the arranger and conductor. The album was released under catalog number LST 7609.

The album was re-released on CD on June 21, 2005, by Collector's Choice Music.

Track listing

Selected personnel
As listed in Go Slow: The Life of Julie London.
 Julie London - vocals
 Bob Knight - trombone
 Bill Perkins - reeds
 Jim Horn - reeds
 Michel Rubini - piano
 Al Casey - guitar
 Neil Levang - guitar
 Mike Deasy - guitar
 Lou Morell - guitar
 Lyle Ritz - electric bass
 John Guerin - drums
 Hal Blaine - drums
 Gary Coleman - percussion
 Dale Anderson - percussion
 Tommy Oliver - producer, arranger, conductor

References

External links
Amazon.com listing for "Yummy, Yummy, Yummy"

Liberty Records albums
1969 albums
Julie London albums
Covers albums